Barr's Subdivision Historic District is a historic district in Citronelle, Alabama, United States. It is roughly bounded by U.S. Route 45 and Howard Avenue between LeBaron Avenue and State Street. It was placed on the National Register of Historic Places on July 7, 2005.

References

Historic districts in Mobile County, Alabama
National Register of Historic Places in Mobile County, Alabama
Historic districts on the National Register of Historic Places in Alabama